Mary Byrne may refer to:
Mary Byrne (mayor) (1917–2004), mayor of Galway
Mary Byrne (singer) (born 1959), Irish singer, 2010 The X Factor UK contestant
Mary Elizabeth Byrne (1880–1931), Irish author and linguist
Mary Freeman Byrne (1886–1961), American author
Mary Gregg Byrne (born 1951), American portraitist, illustrator, and landscape artist
Mary Byrne (witness), Irish woman considered to be the chief witness of the apparition at Knock, County Mayo
Mary Martha Byrne (born 1969), American actress
Mary Rose Byrne (born 1979), Australian actress
 Mary Green (painter) (1766–1845), British painter born Mary Byrne

See also
Mary Burns (disambiguation)
Byrne (surname)